Neosho Township is a township in Coffey County, Kansas, United States. As of the 2000 census, its population was 140.

Geography
According to the USGS, it contains three cemeteries: Big Creek, Crandell and Lorenz Schlichter Memorial.

The streams of Big Creek, Long Creek, North Big Creek, South Big Creek and Turkey Creek run through this township.

Transportation
Neosho Township contains one airport or landing strip, McMullen Airport.

References
 USGS Geographic Names Information System (GNIS)

External links
 City-Data.com

Townships in Coffey County, Kansas
Townships in Kansas